Decoded may refer to:

Decoded (memoir), autobiography of rapper Jay-Z
Brad Meltzer's Decoded, a 2010–12 American TV series
Decoded (novel), a 2002 Chinese novel by Mai Jia
Decoded (Chinese TV series), a 2016 TV series based on the novel

See also
Decoder (disambiguation)
Decoding (disambiguation)
Code (disambiguation)